Cedar Avenue Bridge may refer to:

10th Avenue Bridge (formerly called the Cedar Avenue Bridge), crossing the Mississippi River in Minneapolis, Minnesota
Cedar Avenue Bridge (Minnesota River), carrying Minnesota State Highway 77 over the Minnesota River between Bloomington and Eagan, Minnesota

See also
 Cedar Avenue (disambiguation)